Punnawithi station is a BTS skytrain station, on the  in Phra Khanong District, Bangkok, Thailand. The station is located on Sukhumvit Road at Soi Punnawithi (Sukhumvit Soi 101).

Apart from the dense residential area surrounding the station, an attraction nearby the station is Dhammamongkol Temple on Soi Punnawithi with very tall and well decorated stupas which also house jade Buddha and Kuan Yin statues. Chanapatana International Design Institute which is founded by the temple is also situated on the same area.

Opened in 2011, it is a part of the  skytrain extension from On Nut to Bearing station.

See also
Bangkok Skytrain

References 

BTS Skytrain stations
Railway stations opened in 2011